Paola Mastrocola (born Turin, 1956) is an Italian writer. She was the recipient of the Rapallo Carige Prize for La gallina volante  in 2001.

References

Italian women novelists
20th-century Italian women writers
20th-century Italian novelists
21st-century Italian women writers
21st-century Italian novelists
Writers from Turin
1956 births
Living people